Step (stylized STEP) is the fifth full-length studio album by Japanese singer-lyricist Meg, released on June 18, 2008 in Japan by Universal Music Japan. This is Meg's highest selling album in her career as well as the second electropop album to reach the top ten in the Oricon charts since Perfume's Game (released two months prior), debuted and peaked at number 8 in the Oricon charts, selling 15,801 units on its first week of release and a total of 29,048 units in Japan.

Track listing
All lyrics written by Meg; all songs composed, arranged and produced by Yasutaka Nakata.

CD
 MAGIC
 KITTENISH
 MAKE LOVE
 PRISM BOY
 HEART
 SUPERSONIC
 SEARCHLIGHT
 NATALIE
 KITTENISH ( mix) (regular edition track)
 PRISM BOY (extended mix) (regular edition track)

DVD
 Magic (PV)
 Heart (PV)
 Magic (Dance Clip)
 Heart (Dance Clip <VJ Mix>)

References

2008 albums
Meg (singer) albums
Universal J albums
Albums produced by Yasutaka Nakata